Goli Khun (also Romanized as Golī Khūn; also known as Golī Khān, Kolī Khān, and Qolī Khān) is a village in Tombi Golgir Rural District, Golgir District, Masjed Soleyman County, Khuzestan Province, Iran. At the 2006 census, its population was 25, in 8 families.

References 

Populated places in Masjed Soleyman County